Jubilee Holdings Limited is a financial services holding company, with its headquarters in Nairobi, Kenya. The company maintains subsidiaries in Kenya, Uganda, Tanzania, Burundi, and Mauritius. Its activities are mainly in the insurance sector.

Jubilee Holdings Limited is a large financial services conglomerate in East Africa, the Indian Ocean Islands, and parts of southwestern Asia. As of December 2013, the company controlled assets valued at over US$678 million (KES:61.16 billion), with shareholder's equity of approximately US$119 million (KES:10.7 billion) The company's subsidiary in Kenya, Jubilee Insurance Company Limited, was the largest insurance company in that country, the largest economy in the East African Community, according to a report by the Insurance Regulatory Authority, released in December 2014.

Jubilee Holdings Limited
The following is a list of subsidiaries (50+% shareholding) and associated companies (less than 50% shareholding) of Jubilee Holdings Limited, who together form the Jubilee Group.

Subsidiaries 
 Jubilee Insurance Company Limited – 100% Shareholding – Kenya – A general and long term insurance provider in Kenya.
 The Jubilee Insurance Company of Uganda Limited - 65% Shareholding - Uganda -  A general insurance provider in Uganda.
 Jubilee Life Insurance Company of Uganda Limited - 65% Shareholding - Uganda -  A long term insurance provider in Uganda.
 The Jubilee Insurance Company of Tanzania Limited - 51% Shareholding - Tanzania -  A general insurance provider in Tanzania.
 Jubilee Life Insurance Corporation of Tanzania Limited - 51% Shareholding - Tanzania - A long term insurance provider in Tanzania.
 The Jubilee Insurance Company of Burundi S.A. - 70% Shareholding - Burundi -  A general and long term insurance provider in Burundi. 20% of this venture is held by the group's sister company, The Diamond Trust Bank Group. The two have AKFED as a common shareholder.
 Jubilee Insurance (Mauritius) Limited - 80% Shareholding -  Mauritius - A general insurance provider in Mauritius. 
 Jubilee Financial Services Limited - 100% - Kenya - A fund management company in Kenya.
 Jubilee Investments Company Limited - 100% Shareholding - Uganda -  An investments holding company.
 Jubilee Investments Tanzania Limited - 100% Shareholding - Tanzania -  An investments holding company.
 Jubilee Investments Burundi Limited - 100% Shareholding - Burundi -  An investments holding company.
 Jubilee Center Burundi  - 80% Shareholding - Burundi -  A property investment company.
 Jubilee Insurance DRC - 100% Shareholding - DR Congo - A health insurance company.

Associates companies 
 PDM (Holdings) Limited - 37.1% - Kenya -  An investment vehicle through which the group has invested in the equity of  Property Development and Management (K) Limited which conducts property investment, development and management.
 IPS Cable Systems Limited - 33.3% - Mauritius - An investment vehicle through which the group has invested in the equity of the 15,000 km Seacom submarine fiber optic cable.
 FCL Holdings Limited - 30.0% - Kenya - An investment vehicle through which the group has invested in the equity of Farmers Choice Limited with its main objective being sale of fresh and processed meat products.
 IPS Power Investment Limited - 27.0% - Kenya -  An investment vehicle through which the group has invested in the equity of Tsavo Power Company Limited that generates electricity for sale.
 Bujagali Holding Power Company Limited - 25.0% Shareholding - Uganda -  An investment vehicle  through which the group has invested in the equity of Bujagali Energy Limited an electricity generating company in Uganda.

Investment 
 Diamond Trust Bank Group - 10.27% Shareholding - A major banking group in East Africa, active in Burundi, Kenya, Tanzania and Uganda. Held through Jubilee Insurance Company Limited.

Shareholding
The shares of stock of the holding company are listed on the stock exchanges in Nairobi, Kampala, and Dar es Salaam. The largest shareholders in the company as of December 2015 are listed in the table below:

Governance
The activities of the Holding Company (The Group), are supervised by an eight-person board of directors, led by Group chairman Nizar N. Juma.

See also
 Nairobi Stock Exchange
 Uganda Securities Exchange
 Dar es Salaam Stock Exchange

References

External links
 Webpage of Jubilee Holdings Limited
  Nairobi Securities Exchange Website

Holding companies established in 1937
1937 establishments in Kenya
Holding companies of Kenya
Insurance companies of Kenya
Companies listed on the Nairobi Securities Exchange
Companies listed on the Uganda Securities Exchange
Companies listed on the Dar es Salaam Stock Exchange
Financial services companies established in 1937